East Lansdowne is a borough in Delaware County, Pennsylvania, United States. The population was 2,668 at the 2010 census.

Geography
East Lansdowne is located at  (39.944162, -75.260253).

East Lansdowne is located about a half a mile west of Southwest Philadelphia and is surrounded by Upper Darby Township, namely the Stonehurst/Stonehurst Hills/69th Street and Fernwood neighborhoods. Union Avenue to the west separates Lansdowne from Upper Darby, while the East Lansdowne border is near Hirst Avenue, leaving a one-block expanse of land that is part of Upper Darby Township. It is the former railroad track that gives East Lansdowne borough's western boundary that vaguely ovoid shape.

The borough of Yeadon is south of the SEPTA Media/Elwyn Line Railroad tracks, about one block south of East Lansdowne.

Education
William Penn School District serves East Lansdowne.
 East Lansdowne Basics Magnet Elementary School (K-6)
 Penn Wood Middle School (7-8) (Darby)
 Penn Wood High School, Cypress Street Campus (9-10)(Yeadon)
 Penn Wood High School, Green Ave Campus (11-12) (Lansdowne)

Private schools:
 Saint Cyril of Alexandria Catholic Elementary School (K-8) - It opened in September 1929. The initial enrollment was 375. In December 2005 the archdiocese proposed closing it, but it remained open after community members, inspired by a child with cystic fibrosis who asked for the Make a Wish foundation to save his school, donated $200,000 to keep it open. This was dubbed the "Miracle at St. Cyril." In 2012 the Roman Catholic Archdiocese of Philadelphia proposed closing it again, intending to merge it into St. Andrew School of Upper Darby. However the archdiocese reversed that decision. Instead it became the Independence Mission Schools, not operated by the archdiocese. In 2012 there were 207 students.

Religion
The Roman Catholic Archdiocese of Philadelphia operates Catholic churches. St. Cyril of Alexandria Church in East Lansdowne opened in June 1928. In 2013 St. Cyril of Alexandria merged into St. Philomena Church in Lansdowne, with the St. Cyril parish closed.

Demographics

As of Census 2010, the racial makeup of the borough was 30.5% White, 55.8% African American, 0.1% Native American, 8.8% Asian, 0.2% Native Hawaiian and Other Pacific Islander, 1.3% from other races, and 3.1% from two or more races. Hispanic or Latino of any race were 4.3% of the population. 22.1% of the borough's population was foreign-born .

As of Census 2000, the population density was 12,517.6 people per square mile (4,754.6/km²). There were 1,012 housing units at an average density of 4,898.6 per square mile (1,860.6/km²). The racial makeup of the borough was 71.2% White, 26.8% African American, 0.08% Native American, 6.03% Asian, 0.46% from other races, and 1.70% from two or more races. Hispanic or Latino of any race were 1.24% of the population.

There were 938 households, out of which 32.8% had children under the age of 18 living with them, 45.6% were married couples living together, 12.7% had a female householder with no husband present, and 35.1% were non-families. 28.9% of all households were made up of individuals, and 10.3% had someone living alone who was 65 years of age or older. The average household size was 2.71 and the average family size was 3.41.

In the borough the population was spread out, with 25.8% under the age of 18, 8.6% from 18 to 24, 31.7% from 25 to 44, 19.9% from 45 to 64, and 14.0% who were 65 years of age or older. The median age was 37 years. For every 100 females there were 100.2 males. For every 100 females age 18 and over, there were 93.6 males.

The median income for a household in the borough was $44,205, and the median income for a family was $53,021. Males had a median income of $37,813 versus $28,409 for females. The per capita income for the borough was $19,558. About 6.2% of families and 7.6% of the population were below the poverty line, including 4.9% of those under age 18 and 10.0% of those age 65 or over.

Transportation

No numbered highways serve East Lansdowne directly. The main thoroughfares in the borough include Pembroke Avenue and Church Lane, which intersect near the east edge of the borough.

Notable features
Oldest 4th of July parade and celebration in Delaware County, PA.

References

External links

 

Populated places established in 1911
Boroughs in Delaware County, Pennsylvania